Knut Ragnar Mikkelsen (born 18 March 1951) is a Norwegian police chief.

He was born in Lunde, Telemark, and graduated with the cand.jur. degree. He was a police superintendent in the Oslo police from 1981 to 1988, and worked as police inspector from 1990 to 1997. From 1 November to 31 December 1994 he was acting chief of police of Oslo. He was the chief of police of Drammen from 1997 to 2001, and in 2001 he became assisting director of the National Police Directorate.

References

1951 births
Living people
People from Nome, Norway
People from Lunde, Telemark
Norwegian police chiefs